SS Kensington was an American passenger ship built for the American Line.

History
As the ship was ordered in 1893, she was immediately laid down in the J&G Thompson Shipyard of Glasgow, Scotland. She was Launched in October 26, 1893 and entered service a year later for the American Line's transatlantic route. In August 1895 the Kensington was sold to the Red Star Line. (One of the company owned by International Navigation Company, which was run by the American Line). After making her final voyage for Red Star line, she was sold to the Dominion Line and was put into service for the Liverpool to Canada route. She would make her final voyage in 1908 before being scrapped in 1910.
 
Her sistership was the SS Southwark (1893).

References

1893 ships
Merchant ships of the United States
Passenger ships of the United States